Lectionary 305 (Gregory-Aland), designated by siglum ℓ 305 (in the Gregory-Aland numbering) is a Greek manuscript of the New Testament, on parchment. Palaeographically it has been assigned to the 12th century. The manuscript is lacunose.

Description 

The original codex contained lessons from the Gospels (Evangelistarium), on 171 parchment leaves, with some lacunae. The leaves are measured.
It begins in Matthew 7:10.

The text is written in Greek minuscule letters, in one column per page, 18 lines per page. The manuscript contains Gospel lessons for selected days only.

The initial letters in red.

History 

Gregory dated the manuscript to the 12th century. It has been assigned by the Institute for New Testament Textual Research (INTF) to the 12th century.

F. S. Ellis bought it 1870.

The manuscript was added to the list of New Testament manuscripts by Frederick Henry Ambrose Scrivener (291e) and Caspar René Gregory (number 305e). It was examined by Hort. Gregory saw it in 1883.

The codex is housed at the Cambridge University Library (Add. Mss. 679.2) in Cambridge.

See also 

 List of New Testament lectionaries
 Biblical manuscript
 Textual criticism
 Lectionary 176

Notes and references

Bibliography 

 

Greek New Testament lectionaries
12th-century biblical manuscripts
Manuscripts in Cambridge